Robert Louis Griess, Jr. (born 1945, Savannah, Georgia) is a mathematician working on finite simple groups and vertex algebras.  He is currently the John Griggs Thompson Distinguished University Professor of mathematics at University of Michigan.

Education
Griess developed a keen interest in mathematics prior to entering undergraduate studies at the University of Chicago in the fall of 1963. There, he eventually earned a Ph.D. in 1971 after defending a dissertation on the Schur multipliers of the then-known finite simple groups.

Career
Griess' work has focused on group extensions, cohomology and Schur multipliers, as well as on vertex operator algebras and the classification of finite simple groups. In 1982, he published the first construction of the monster group using the Griess algebra, and in 1983 he was an invited speaker at the International Congress of Mathematicians in Warsaw to give a lecture on the sporadic groups and his construction of the monster group.

He became a member of the American Academy of Arts and Sciences in 2007, and a fellow of the American Mathematical Society in 2012. In 2020 he became a member of the National Academy of Sciences. Since 2006, Robert Griess has been an editor for Electronic Research Announcements of the AIMS (ERA-AIMS), a peer-review journal.

In 2010, he was awarded the AMS Leroy P. Steele Prize for Seminal Contribution to Research for his construction of the monster group, which he originally named the friendly giant.

Selected publications

Books

Journal articles

References

External links

 Homepage at the Department of Mathematics at the University of Michigan
  for the Mathematical Science Literature lecture series, Harvard University (2020)

Living people
20th-century American mathematicians
21st-century American mathematicians
Group theorists
University of Michigan faculty
Fellows of the American Mathematical Society
1945 births